Castle Ashby & Earls Barton railway station is a former railway station in Northamptonshire on the former  Northampton and Peterborough Railway, a line which connected Peterborough and Northampton.

In 1846 the line, along with the London and Birmingham, became part of the London and North Western Railway. At grouping in 1923 it became part of the London Midland and Scottish Railway.

Present day 
The station's goods buildings remained open as a restaurant known as Dunkleys. It features two carriages which are visible from the road linking Earls Barton and Castle Ashby. Dunkleys has now closed down and the site has been developed for residential dwellings.

The former service 
The service was from Peterborough to Northampton via Wellingborough. The station opened in 1845 and closed in 1964 to passengers.

References

External links
 Subterranea Britannica

Railway stations in Great Britain opened in 1845
Railway stations in Great Britain closed in 1964
Disused railway stations in Northamptonshire
Former London and Birmingham Railway stations
Beeching closures in England
John William Livock buildings
Earls Barton